The qualifications round of the women's artistic gymnastics competition at the 2012 Summer Olympics was held at the North Greenwich Arena on July 29. The top 8 teams advanced to the team final, the top 24 gymnasts (with a limit of two per country) to the individual all-around final, and the top 8 gymnasts on each apparatus (with a limit of two per country) to the apparatus finals.

Subdivisions
Gymnasts from nations taking part in the team all-around event were grouped together, while gymnasts competing without full teams were divided into eight "mixed groups". The groups were split among five subdivisions according to a draw held by the Fédération Internationale de Gymnastique, and rotated through the four apparatuses together.

Subdivision 1

Mixed Group 1

Mixed Group 2

Mixed Group 6

Subdivision 2

Mixed Group 3

Mixed Group 4

Subdivision 3

Subdivision 4

Mixed Group 7

 DSQ

Subdivision 5

Mixed Group 5

Mixed Group 8

Results

Individual all-around qualifiers 

Because only two competitors per country were allowed to advance to the all-around final, some gymnasts in the top 24 did not advance. They were:
  (4th place)
  (12th place)
  (21st place)
  (22nd place)

Reserves 
The reserves for the individual all-around final were:

Vault final qualifiers

Reserves

Uneven bars final qualifiers

Reserves 
 
 
 
Notes

China's Huang Qiushuang ranked 7th with a score of 15.266, but did not qualify to the final because of the two-per-country rule. Kōko Tsurumi, ranked 9th, qualified instead. Similarly, Jordyn Wieber did not qualify as the third reserve because two other Americans ranked higher.

Balance beam final qualifiers

Reserves 
 
 
 

Notes

The United States' Kyla Ross ranked 6th with a score of 15.075, but did not qualify to the final because of the two-per-country rule; Anastasia Grishina of Russia, who was next in line in 9th place, could not qualify for the same reason. Diana Bulimar, in 10th place, qualified instead. Also because of the two-per-country rule, Larisa Iordache (ROU), Aliya Mustafina (RUS), Jordyn Wieber (USA), and Sandra Izbașa (ROU) did not qualify as reserves.

Floor exercise final qualifiers

Reserves 
 
 
 
Notes

Romania's Diana Chelaru ranked 10th but did not qualify as a reserve because of the two-per-country rule.

References

Gymnastics at the 2012 Summer Olympics
2012
2012 in women's gymnastics
Women's events at the 2012 Summer Olympics

ru:Спортивная гимнастика на летних Олимпийских играх 2012 — квалификация